Eastern striped skink may refer to:

 Ctenotus robustus in Australia
 the eastern race of Trachylepis striata in Africa